Sebastián Leonel Cuerdo (born 16 July 1986) is an Argentine footballer who plays as a goalkeeper.

Honours

Club
Arsenal de Sarandí
 Copa Sudamericana (1): 2007

Cobresal
 Primera División de Chile (1): 2015 Clausura

External links
 
 

1986 births
Living people
Argentine footballers
Argentine expatriate footballers
San Martín de Tucumán footballers
Independiente Rivadavia footballers
Arsenal de Sarandí footballers
Racing de Córdoba footballers
Club Atlético River Plate footballers
Cobresal footballers
Sport Huancayo footballers
León de Huánuco footballers
Club Sportivo Estudiantes players
Deportes Iquique footballers
Chacarita Juniors footballers
Chilean Primera División players
Peruvian Primera División players
Primera Nacional players
Argentine expatriate sportspeople in Chile
Argentine expatriate sportspeople in Peru
Expatriate footballers in Chile
Expatriate footballers in Peru
Association football goalkeepers
Sportspeople from Santiago del Estero Province